For the state pageant affiliated with Miss America's Outstanding Teen, see Miss Michigan's Outstanding Teen

The Miss Michigan's Outstanding Teen competition is the pageant that selects the representative from the U.S. state of Michigan in the Miss America's Outstanding Teen pageant.

Grace Larsen of Coloma was crowned Miss Michigan's Outstanding Teen on June 17, 2022 at the Frauenthal Center in Muskegon, Michigan. She competed for the title of Miss America's Outstanding Teen 2023 at the Hyatt Regency Dallas in Dallas, Texas on August 12, 2022.

Results summary 
The year in parentheses indicates year of Miss America's Outstanding Teen competition the award/placement was garnered.

Placements 

 1st runners-up: Nina Davuluri (2007), Marissa Cowans (2012)
 4th runners-up: Katie Preston (2018)
 Top 10: Brooke Rowland (2011)
 Top 12: Alisha Gatchel (2015)

Awards

Preliminary awards 
 Preliminary Evening Wear/On-Stage Question: Nina Davuluri (2007)
 Preliminary Talent: Julia Smith (2014), Katie Preston (2018)
 Preliminary Lifestyle and Fitness: Julia Smith (2014)

Non-finalist awards 
 Non-finalist Talent: Julia Smith (2014)

Other awards 
 Scholastic Excellence: Brooke Rowland (2011)
 Outstanding Dance Talent: Julia Smith (2014)
 Outstanding Vocal Talent: Katie Preston (2018)

Winners

References

External links
 Official website

Michigan
Michigan culture
Women in Michigan
Annual events in Michigan